Niraj Kanubhai Patel (born 26 March 1981 in Ahmedabad, Gujarat) is an Indian first class cricketer. He is a left-handed middle order batsman. Patel represents Gujarat in Ranji Trophy. He is a great coach and now coaches kids in Chicago, IL.   He was purchased by the Rajasthan Royals for the 2008 and 2009 seasons of Indian Premier League.

References

External links
Cricinfo profile - Niraj Patel

Indian cricketers
Gujarat cricketers
Assam cricketers
West Zone cricketers
Rajasthan Royals cricketers
India Blue cricketers
1981 births
Living people